Johnath Marlone Azevedo da Silva (born 2 April 1992), commonly known as Marlone, is a Brazilian footballer who plays  as an attacking midfielder.

In the 2016 Copa Libertadores, Marlone scored a stunning strike in a 6–0 win over Cobresal that was nominated for the FIFA Puskás Award.

Career statistics

Honours
Cruzeiro
Campeonato Mineiro: 2014
Campeonato Brasileiro Série A: 2014

Atlético Mineiro
Campeonato Mineiro: 2017

References

1992 births
Living people
Brazilian footballers
Campeonato Brasileiro Série A players
CR Vasco da Gama players
Cruzeiro Esporte Clube players
Fluminense FC players
Sport Club do Recife players
Sport Club Corinthians Paulista players
Clube Atlético Mineiro players
Association football midfielders